The Valle Nacional River is a river of Oaxaca state in Mexico.
The river originates in the Sierra Juárez.
The ecology of the region, originally one of pine forests, is threatened by logging, agriculture and grazing.
The Valle Nacional flows past San Juan Bautista Valle Nacional, and joins the Santo Domingo River to the southwest of  San Juan Bautista Tuxtepec to form the Papaloapan River.

See also
List of rivers of Mexico

References

Rivers of Oaxaca
Sierra Madre de Oaxaca
Papaloapan River